Pat Anderson is an American actress best known for her work in 1970s exploitation films. She played Elaine, an undercover CIA agent who assists the title character in T.N.T. Jackson (1974).

Select filmography
 1973 Bonnie's Kids
 1973 Fly Me
 1974 Dirty O'Neil
 1974 Newman's Law
 1974 T.N.T. Jackson
 1975 Summer School Teachers
 1975 Cover Girl Models
 1978 What Really Happened to the Class of '65? – episode "Mr Potential"
 1984 Dynasty – episode
 1983 Angel of H.E.A.T.
 1983 September Gun – TV movie
 1987 Jake and the Fatman - episode "Have Yourself a Merry Little Christmas"
 2002 Reflections of Evil

References

External links

Living people
20th-century American actresses
American film actresses
Year of birth missing (living people)
Place of birth missing (living people)
Actresses from Wisconsin
People from Superior, Wisconsin
American television actresses
21st-century American actresses